Ali ibn Hanzala ibn Abi Salim al-Mahfuzi al-Wadi'i al-Hamdani was the sixth Tayyibi Isma'ili Dāʿī al-Muṭlaq in Yemen, from 1215 to his death in 1229.

Life
A member of the Banu Hamdan tribe, Ali ibn Hanzala had been active within the Tayyibi daʿwa, already during the tenure of the third Dāʿī al-Muṭlaq, Hatim ibn Ibrahim (1162–1199). Under the fifth Dāʿī al-Muṭlaq, Ali ibn Muhammad ibn al-Walid (1209–1215), he served as his senior deputy (maʾdhūn) and succeeded him when the latter died in 1215. The position of Dāʿī al-Muṭlaq ("absolute/unrestricted missionary") was the supreme authority of the Tayyibi community in their capacity as vicegerents of the absent Imam, the eponymous at-Tayyib Abu'l-Qasim, who remained in occultation.

Like most of his predecessors and successors, Ali enjoyed good relations with the Hamdanid dynasty ruling Sanaa and their Ayyubid overlords, which allowed him to reside both in Sanaa and in the Hatimid Hamdanid stronghold of Dhu Marmar. He sent junior dāʿīs to assist the growing Isma'ili community in western India. At the same time, he confronted the attempts of the rival Hafizi Isma'ili daʿwa and the Zaydi imams to expand their influence in his territories.

His own chief aides (maʾdhūn) were both relatives of his predecessor, Ali ibn Muhammad: Ahmad ibn Mubarak, Ali's nephew, and Ali's son al-Husayn. Both would succeed him as Dāʿī al-Muṭlaq after his death on 8 February 1229.

Writings
Ali ibn Hanzala was very well educated, with a particular interest in astrology and natural sciences.  He wrote two theological works on Tayyibi esoteric doctrine (ḥaqāʾiq):
 the Simṭ al-ḥaqaʾiq ("Banquet of reality"), a work on Tayyibi concepts on tawḥīd, cosmology and eschatology, written as a poem of 663 verses. It has been edited and published in Damascus in 1953 by Abbas al-Azzawi at the Institut Français de Damas.
 the Risālat ḍiyāʾ al-ʿulūm wa-miṣbāʿ al-ʿulūm ("Treatise on the radiance of reason and the light of knowledge"), divided into four chapters, it also deals with matters of tawḥīd, cosmology and eschatology, as well as other theological questions.

References

Sources
 
 
 

Yemeni Ismailis
Tayyibi da'is
Year of birth unknown
1229 deaths
Banu Hamdan
Ismaili theologians
13th century in Yemen
13th-century Arabs
13th-century Ismailis
13th-century Islamic religious leaders